Norborne Thompson (c.1769 – 28 May 1844) was an officer of the Royal Navy.

Life 
Thompson was born circa 1769. He was made a lieutenant in 1790, serving on the 98-gun  at the attack on Pointe-à-Pitre on Guadeloupe, the Caribbean in 1794. He was made commander on 25 March 1796 and later that year put in command of the sloop , and later the 16-gun . Savage was part of Sir Home Popham's squadron at Ostend, in May 1798. Thompson was made post-captain on 11 August 1800, commanding in turn the 74-gun  and then the 38-gun frigate , in which ship he assisted at the reduction of Flushing in 1809 during the Walcheren Campaign.

Aboukir remained on station in the Mediterranean, taking part in the capture of Genoa in April 1814 before returning to Chatham after Napoleon's defeat later that year and being decommissioned by 1816. He was in command of  c.1827, on the home station. He was promoted to the rank of rear-admiral in 1830, and to that of vice-admiral in 1841. He died at the age of 75 on 28 May 1844 at Great Russell Street, Bloomsbury.

References

External links 
 His will at the National Archives
 Record of his death in The Annual Register
 Obituary in The Gentleman's Magazine
 The Annual Register or A View of the History, Politics, and Literature of the Year 1826. (1 July 1826)

Year of birth unknown
1844 deaths
Royal Navy admirals
Royal Navy personnel of the French Revolutionary Wars
Royal Navy personnel of the Napoleonic Wars